Ilya Khomenko (born 14 October 1995) is a Russian competitive swimmer who specializes in breaststroke.

In 2013 he became world junior champion in the 100 meter breaststroke in a new championships record.

He qualified for the 2016 Summer Olympics in Rio de Janeiro in the 200 meter breaststroke. He swam the 4th time in the heats and qualified for the semifinals, where he finished 10th overall.

References

1995 births
Living people
Russian male swimmers
Male breaststroke swimmers
Russian male breaststroke swimmers
Swimmers at the 2016 Summer Olympics
Olympic swimmers of Russia
European Aquatics Championships medalists in swimming
Universiade silver medalists for Russia
Medalists at the 2019 Summer Universiade
Universiade medalists in swimming